This is a list of butterflies of Bangladesh. About 430 species are known from Bangladesh, but it is estimated that a total number of 500 to 550 species occurs.

Papilionidae

Papilioninae
Troides helena cerberus Felder & Felder, 1865
Troides aeacus aeacus Felder & Felder, 1860
Pachliopta aristolochiae aristolochiae Fabricius, 1775
Pachliopta hector Linné, 1758
Losaria coon cacharensis Butler, 1885
Atrophaneura varuna astorion Westwood, 1842
Atrophaneura nevilli Wood-Mason, 1882
Papilio demoleus demoleus Linné, 1758
Papilio helenus helenus Linné, 1758
Papilio chaon Westwood, 1845
Papilio polytes romulus Cramer, 1775
Papilio alcmenor alcmenor Felder & Felder, 1864
Papilio castor castor Westwood, 1842
Papilio protenor euprotenor Fruhstorfer, 1908
Papilio memnon agenor Linné, 1758
Papilio polymnestor polymnestor Cramer, 1775
Papilio elephenor Doubleday, 1845
Papilio paris paris Linné, 1758
Papilio palinurus palinurus Fabricius, 1787
Papilio crino Fabricius, 1793
Chilasa slateri slateri Hewitson, 1857
Chilasa clytia clytia Linné, 1758
Chilasa paradoxa telearchus Hewitson, 1852
Graphium doson axion Felder & Felder, 1864
Graphium eurypylus cheronus Jordan, 1909
Graphium chironides chironides Honrath, 1884
Graphium agamemnon agamemnon Linné, 1758
Graphium sarpedon sarpedon Linné, 1758
Paranticopsis macareus indicus Rothschild, 1895
Paranticopsis xenocles xenocles Doubleday, 1842
Pathysa nomius swinhoei Moore, 1878
Pathysa aristeus anticrates Doubleday, 1846
Pathysa antipathes pompilius Fabricius, 1787
Pathysa agetes agetes Westwood, 1843
Lamproptera curius curius Fabricius, 1787

Pieridae

Coliadinae
Gandaca harina assamica Moore, 1906
Catopsilia pomona pomona Fabricius, 1775
Catopsilia pyranthe pyranthe Linné, 1758
Eurema blanda silhetana Wallace, 1867
Eurema hecabe hecabe Linné, 1758
Eurema andersoni jordani Corbet & Pendlebury, 1932
Eurema brigitta rubella Wallace, 1867
Eurema laeta sikkima Moore, 1906

Pierinae
Ixias marianne Cramer, 1779
Ixias pyrene latifasciata Butler, 1871
Hebomoia glaucippe glaucippe Linné, 1758
Cepora nerissa nerissa Fabricius, 1775
Cepora nadina nadina Lucas, 1852
Pieris brassicae brassicae Linné, 1758
Artogeia canidia indica Evans, 1926
Belenois aurota Fabricius, 1793
Appias indra indra Moore, 1857
Appias lalage lalage Doubleday, 1842
Appias lyncida eleonora Boisduval, 1836
Appias olferna olferna Swinhoe, 1890
Appias albina darada Felder & Felder, 1865
Appias paulina adamsoni Moore, 1905
Appias nero galba Wallace, 1867
Prioneris philonome clemanthe Doubleday, 1842
Prioneris thestylis thestylis Doubleday, 1842
Pareronia hippia hippia Fabricius, 1787
Leptosia nina nina Fabricius, 1793
Delias eucharis Drury, 1773
Delias hyparete indica Wallace, 1867
Delias descombesi descombesi Boisduval, 1836
Delias pasithoe pasithoe Linné, 1767

Lycaenidae

Miletinae
Miletus chinensis assamensis Doherty, 1891
Allotinus unicolor continentalis Fruhstorfer, 1913
Allotinus drumila drumila Moore, 1866
Allotinus taras Doherty, 1889
Logania distanti massalia Doherty, 1891
Taraka hamada mendesia Fruhstorfer, 1918
Spalgis epeus epeus Westwood, 1851

Poritiinae
Poritia hewitsoni hewitsoni Moore, 1866

Curetinae
Curetis thetis thetis Drury, 1773
Curetis saronis gloriosa Moore, 1883
Curetis cf saronis Moore, 1877
Curetis bulis bulis Westwood, 1851
Curetis acuta dentata Moore, 1879

Aphnaeinae
Cigaritis lohita himalayanus (Moore, 1884)
Cigaritis vulcanus vulcanus (Fabricius, 1775)
Cigaritis syama peguanus (Moore, 1884)
Cigaritis ictis (Hewitson, 1865)
Cigaritis elima elima (Moore, 1877)

Theclinae
Arhopala camdeo Moore, 1857
Arhopala athada apha de Nicéville, 1895
Arhopala silhetensis silhetensis Hewitson, 1862
Arhopala oenea Hewitson, 1869
Arhopala khamti Doherty, 1891
Arhopala atrax Hewitson, 1867
Arhopala bazaloides bazaloides Hewitson, 1878
Arhopala amantes apella Swinhoe, 1886
Arhopala singla de Nicéville, 1885
Arhopala bazalus teesta de Nicéville, 1886
Arhopala eumolphus eumolphus Cramer, 1780
Arhopala hellenore hellenore Doherty, 1889
Arhopala centaurus pirithous Moore, 1883
Arhopala agaba agaba Hewitson, 1862
Arhopala perimuta perimuta Moore, 1858
Flos diardi diardi Hewitson, 1862
Flos apidanus ahamus Doherty, 1891
Mahathala ameria ameria Hewitson, 1862
Surendra quercetorum Moore, 1857
Amblypodia anita anita Hewitson, 1862
Iraota timoleon timoleon Stoll, 1790
Zesius chrysomallus Hübner, 1823
Catapaecilma major major Druce, 1895
Loxura atymnus continentalis Fruhstorfer, 1911
Yasoda tripunctata Hewitson, 1869
Drina donina donina Hewitson, 1865
Eooxylides tharis tharis Hübner, 1837
Rathinda amor Fabricius, 1775
Horaga onyx onyx Moore, 1858
Horaga syrinx sikkima Moore, 1883
Horaga albimacula viola Moore, 1882
Cheritra freja evansi Cowan, 1965
Ticherra acte acte Moore, 1858
Drupadia ravindra boisduvalii Moore, 1884
Pratapa deva lila Moore, 1883
Dacalana penicilligera de Nicéville, 1890
Tajuria jehana jehana Moore, 1883
Tajuria cippus cippus Fabricius, 1798
Tajuria melastigma de Nicéville, 1887
Charana cepheis de Nicéville, 1894
Rachana jalindra indra Moore, 1883
Creon cleobis cleobis Godart, 1823
Remelana jangala ravata Moore, 1865
Chliaria othona othona Hewitson, 1865
Chliaria kina kina Hewitson, 1869
Hypolycaena erylus himavantus Fruhstorfer, 1912
Zeltus amasa amasa Hewitson, 1865
Artipe eryx eryx Linné, 1771
Deudorix epijarbas amatius Fruhstorfer, 1912
Deudorix gaetulia de Nicéville, 1892
Deudorix isocrates Fabricius, 1793
Sinthusa chandrana grotei Moore, 1884
Bindahara phocides phocides Fabricius, 1793
Rapala manea schistacea Moore, 1879
Rapala scintilla scintilla de Nicéville, 1890
Rapala varuna orseis Hewitson, 1877
Rapala nissa rectivitta Moore, 1879
Rapala pheretima petosiris Hewitson, 1863
Rapala dieneces dieneces Hewitson, 1878
Rapala suffusa suffusa Moore, 1883
Rapala iarbus sorya Kollar, 1848
Araotes lapithis lapithis Moore, 1857

Polyommatinae
Anthene lycaenina lycambes Hewitson, 1878
Anthene emolus emolus Godart, 1824
Nacaduba pactolus continentalis Fruhstorfer, 1916
Nacaduba hermus nabo Fruhstorfer, 1916
Nacaduba pavana vajuva Fruhstorfer, 1916
Nacaduba berenice plumbeomicans Wood-Mason & de Nicéville, 1880
Nacaduba kurava euplea Fruhstorfer, 1916
Nacaduba beroe gythion Fruhstorfer, 1916
Ionolyce helicon merguiana Moore, 1884
Petrelaea dana de Nicéville, 1883
Prosotas nora ardates Moore, 1875
Prosotas pia marginata Tite, 1963
Prosotas aluta coelestis Wood-Mason & de Nicéville, 1887
Prosotas dubiosa indica Evans, 1925
Prosotas lutea sivoka Evans, 1910
Caleta decidia decidia Hewitson, 1876
Caleta elna noliteia Fruhstorfer, 1918
Discolampa ethion ethion Westwood, 1851
Jamides pura pura Moore, 1886
Jamides celeno celeno Cramer, 1775
Jamides alecto eurysaces Fruhstorfer, 1916
Jamides elpis pseudelpis Butler, 1879
Jamides bochus bochus Stoll, 1782
Lampides boeticus Linné, 1767
Castalius rosimon Fabricius, 1775
Tarucus callinara Butler, 1867
Tarucus balkanicus nigra Bethune-Baker, 1918
Tarucus venosus Evans, Moore, 1882
Leptotes plinius Fabricius, 1793
Zizeeria karsandra Moore, 1865
Zizeeria otis otis Fabricius, 1787
Pseudozizeeria maha maha Kollar, 1848
Zizula hylax Fabricius, 1775
Pithecops corvus correctus Cowan, 1965
Azanus uranus Butler, 1866
Azanus ubaldus Cramer, 1782
Acytolepis puspa gisca Fruhstorfer, 1910
Neopithecops zalmora zalmora Butler, 1870
Megisba malaya sikkima Moore, 1884
Euchrysops cnejus Fabricius, 1798
Catochrysops strabo strabo Fabricius, 1793
Catochrysops panormus exiguus Distant, 1886
Luthrodes pandava (Horsfield, 1829)
Chilades lajus lajus Stoll, 1870
Freyeria putli (Kollar, 1844)
Cupido lacturnus assamica (Tytler, 1915)

Lycaeninae
Heliophorus epicles latilimbata Eliot, 1963

Riodinidae

Nemeobiinae
Abisara echerius suffusa Moore, 1882
Zemeros flegyas flegyas Cramer, 1780
Dodona eugenes venox Fruhstorfer, 1912
Taxila haquinus fasciata Moore, 1878

Nymphalidae

Libytheinae
Libythea myrrha sanguinalis Fruhstorfer, 1898

Danainae
Parantica agleoides agleoides Felder & Felder, 1860
Parantica aglea melanoides Moore, 1883
Parantica melaneus plataniston Fruhstorfer, 1910
Tirumala limniace exoticus Gmélin, 1790
Tirumala septentrionis septentrionis Butler, 1874
Tirumala gautama Moore, 1877
Danaus chrysippus chrysippus Linné, 1758
Danaus genutia genutia Cramer, 1779
Danaus melanippus indicus Fruhstorfer, 1899
Euploea sylvester hopei Felder & Felder, 1865
Euploea mulciber mulciber Cramer, 1777
Euploea midamus rogenhoferi Felder & Felder, 1865
Euploea klugii klugii Moore, 1858
Euploea algea deione Westwood, 1848
Euploea core core Cramer, 1780
Euploea crameri nicevillei Moore, 1890
Euploea doubledayi doubledayi Felder & Felder, 1865
Euploea radamanthus radamanthus Fabricius, 1793
Idea agamarschana arrakana Fruhstorfer, 1910

Satyrinae
Melanitis leda leda Linné, 1758
Melanitis phedima bela Moore, 1857
Orinoma damaris Gray, 1846
Ethope himachala Moore, 1857
Penthema lisarda lisarda Doubleday, 1845
Elymnias hypermnestra undularis Drury, 1773
Elymnias penanga chelensis de Nicéville, 1890
Elymnias nesaea timandra Wallace, 1869
Elymnias malelas malelas Hewitson, 1865
Elymnias patna patna Westwood, 1851
Elymnias vasudeva deva Moore, 1893
Lethe vindhya vindhya C. Felder, 1859
Lethe mekara zuchara Fruhstorfer, 1911
Lethe europa niladana Fruhstorfer, 1911
Lethe rohria rohria Fabricius, 1787
Mycalesis francisca sanatana Moore, 1857
Mycalesis anaxias aemate Fruhstorfer, 1911
Mycalesis gotama charaka Moore, 1874
Mycalesis perseus blasius Fabricius, 1798
Mycalesis mineus mineus Linné, 1767
Mycalesis intermedia Moore, 1891
Mycalesis visala visala Moore, 1857
Mycalesis suaveolens suaveolens Wood-Mason & de Nicéville, 1883
Mycalesis malsarida Butler, 1868
Mycalesis malsara Moore, 1857
Orsotriaena medus medus Fabricius, 1775
Erites falcipennis falcipennis Wood-Mason & de Nicéville, 1883
Ragadia crisilda crisilda Hewitson, 1862
Ypthima inica Hewitson, 1864
Ypthima huebneri Kirby, 1871
Ypthima baldus baldus Fabricius, 1775

Morphinae
Thaumantis diores diores Doubleday, 1845
Discophora sondaica zal Westwood, 1851
Discophora timora timora Westwood, 1850
Stichopthalma camadeva camadevoides de Nicéville, 1899
Amathuxidia amythaon amythaon Doubleday, 1847

Apaturinae
Rohana parisatis parisatis Westwood, 1850
Dilipa morgiana Westwood, 1850
Euripus nyctelius nyctelius Doubleday, 1845

Charaxinae
Charaxes psaphon imna Butler, 1870
Charaxes bernardus Felder & Felder, 1867
Charaxes marmax marmax Westwood, 1848
Charaxes kahruba kahruba Moore, 1896
Charaxes solon sulphureus Rothschild & Jordan, 1898
Polyura athamas athamas Drury, 1770
Polyura arja Felder & Felder, 1867
Polyura delphis delphis Doubleday, 1843
Polyura schreiber assamensis Rothschild, 1899

Heliconiinae
Acraea violae Fabricius, 1775
Cethosia cyane cyane Drury, 1773
Cethosia biblis tisamena Fruhstorfer, 1912
Phalanta phalantha phalantha Drury, 1770
Phalanta alcippe alcippoides Moore, 1899
Cirrochroa tyche mithila Moore, 1872
Vagrans sinha sinha Kollar, 1848
Cupha erymanthis lotis Sulzer, 1776
Vindula erota erota Fabricius, 1793
Argynnis hyperbius hyperbius (Linnaeus, 1763)

Limenitidinae
Dophla evelina derma Kollar, 1848
Bassarona teuta teuta Doubleday, 1848
Lexias dirtea khasiana Swinhoe, 1893
Lexias cyanipardus cyanipardus Butler, 1869
Euthalia lubentina indica Fruhstorfer, 1904
Euthalia aconthea garuda Moore, 1857
Euthalia alpheda jama Felder & Felder, 1867
Euthalia anosia anosia Moore, 1857
Euthalia monina kesava Moore, 1859
Euthalia telchinia Ménétriés, 1857
Euthalia phemius Doubleday, 1849
Tanaecia julii appiades Ménétriés, 1857
Tanaecia lepidea lepidea Butler, 1868
Tanaecia jahnu jahnu Moore, 1857
Symphaedra nais Forster, 1771
Lebadea martha martha Fabricius, 1778
Parthenos sylvia gambrisius Fabricius, 1787
Neurosigma siva siva Westwood, 1850
Athyma perius perius Linné, 1758
Athyma asura asura Moore, 1858
Athyma pravara acutipennis Fruhstorfer, 1906
Athyma kanwa phorkys Fruhstorfer, 1912
Athyma inara inara Westwood, 1850
Athyma ranga ranga Moore, 1857
Athyma selenophora bahula Moore, 1858
Sumalia daraxa daraxa Doubleday, 1848
Moduza procris procris Cramer, 1777
Pantoporia hordonia hordonia Stoll, 1790
Pantoporia sandaka davidsoni Eliot, 1969
Pantoporia paraka paraka Butler, 1879
Lasippa tiga camboja Moore, 1879
Lasippa viraja viraja Moore, 1872
Neptis hylas kamarupa Moore, 1872
Neptis sappho astola Moore, 1872
Neptis clinia susruta Moore, 1872
Neptis nata adipala Moore, 1872
Neptis soma soma Moore, 1858
Neptis jumbah jumbah Moore, 1857
Neptis magadha khasiana Moore, 1872
Neptis harita harita Moore, 1874
Neptis nashona nashona Swinhoe, 1896
Neptis miah miah Moore, 1857
Phaedyma columella ophiana Moore, 1872

Cyrestinae
Cyrestis thyodamas thyodamas Boisduval, 1836
Chersonesia risa risa Westwood, 1848
Pseudergolis wedah Kollar, 1844
Stibochiona nicea nicea Gray, 1846
Dichorragia nesimachus nesimachus Doyére, 1840

Biblidinae
Ariadne merione tapestrina Moore, 1884
Ariadne ariadne pallidior Fruhstorfer, 1899

Nymphalinae
Hypolimnas misippus Linné, 1758
Hypolimnas bolina bolina Linné, 1758
Junonia orithya ocyale Hübner, 1816
Junonia hierta hierta Fabricius, 1793
Junonia lemonias lemonias Linné, 1758
Junonia almana almana Linné, 1758
Junonia atlites atlites Linné, 1763
Junonia iphita iphita Cramer, 1779
Doleschallia bisaltide indica Moore, 1899
Kallima inachus inachus Boisduval, 1836
Rhinopalpa polynice birmana Fruhstorfer, 1897
Vanessa cardui cardui Linné, 1758
Symbrenthia lilaea khasiana Moore, 1874

Hesperiidae

Coeliadinae
Bibasis oedipodea belesis Mabille, 1876
Bibasis harisa harisa Moore, 1865
Bibasis iluska mahintha Moore, 1874
Bibasis sena sena Moore, 1865
Hasora chromus chromus Cramer, 1782
Hasora taminatus bhavara Fruhstorfer, 1911
Hasora khoda coulteri Wood-Mason & de Nicéville, 1887
Hasora anura anura de Nicéville, 1889
Hasora badra badra Moore, 1858
Hasora vitta indica Evans, 1932
Choaspes benjaminii formosanus Fruhstorfer, 1911
Badamia exclamationis Fabricius, 1775

Pyrginae
Capila phanaeus fiducia Evans, 1949
Celaenorrhinus asmara consertus de Nicéville, 1890
Celaenorrhinus leucocera Kollar, 1844
Celaenorrhinus aurivittata aurivittata Moore, 1865
Pseudocoladenia dan fabia Evans, 1949
Coladenia indrani indrani Moore, 1865
Sarangesa dasahara dasahara Moore, 1865
Odontoptilum angulata angulata Felder, 1862
Gerosis bhagava bhagava Moore, 1866
Gerosis phisara phisara Moore, 1884
Tagiades japetus ravi Moore, 1865
Tagiades gana athos Plötz, 1884
Tagiades litigiosa litigiosa Möschler, 1878
Spialia galba galba Fabricius, 1793

Hesperiinae
Astictopterus jama olivascens Moore, 1878
Baracus vittatus septentrionum Wood-Mason & Nicéville, 1887
Ampittia dioscorides dioscorides Fabricius, 1793
Aeromachus pygmaeus pygmaeus Fabricius, 1793
Halpe sikkima Moore, 1882
Halpe porus Mabille, 1876
Pithauria stramineipennis stramineipennis Wood-Mason & de Nicéville, 1887
Pithauria marsena Hewitson, 1855
Iambrix salsala salsala Moore, 1865
Koruthaialos rubecula cachara Evans, 1949
Sancus fuligo subfasciatus Moore, 1878
Udaspes folus Cramer, 1775
Ancistroides nigrita diocles Moore, 1865
Notocrypta feisthameli alysos Moore, 1865
Notocrypta curvifascia curvifascia Felder, 1862
Notocrypta paralysos asawa Fruhstorfer, 1911
Scobura isota Swinhoe, 1893
Suada swerga swerga de Nicéville, 1883
Suastus gremius gremius Fabricius, 1798
Suastus minuta aditia Evans, 1943
Cupitha purreea Moore, 1877
Hyarotis adrastus praba Moore, 1865
Hyarotis microstictum microstictum Wood-Mason & de Nicéville, 1887
Quedara monteithi monteithi Wood-Mason & de Nicéville, 1887
Gangara thyrsis thyrsis Fabricius, 1775
Erionota thrax thrax Linné, 1767
Matapa aria Moore, 1865
Matapa druna Moore, 1865
Matapa cresta Evans, 1949
Matapa sasivarna Moore, 1865
Taractrocera maevius maevius Fabricius, 1893
Oriens gola pseudolus Mabille, 1883
Telicota colon stinga Evans, 1949
Telicota besta besta Evans, 1949
Telicota linna linna Evans, 1949
Telicota bambusae bambusae Moore, 1878
Potanthus trachala tytleri Evans, 1914
Potanthus pseudomaesa clio Evans, 1932
Potanthus confucius dushta Fruhstorfer, 1911
Cephrenes chrysozona oceanica Mabille, 1904
Parnara guttatus mangala Moore, 1865
Parnara bada bada Moore, 1878
Parnara ganga Evans, 1937
Borbo cinnara Wallace, 1866
Pseudoborbo bevani Moore, 1878
Pelopidas sinensis Mabille, 1877
Pelopidas agna agna Moore, 1865
Pelopidas subochracea subochracea Moore, 1878
Pelopidas mathias mathias Fabricius, 1798
Pelopidas conjuncta conjuncta Herrich-Schäffer, 1869
Pelopidas assamensis de Niceville, 1882
Baoris farri farri Moore, 1878
Baoris chapmani Evans, 1937
Baoris unicolor Moore, 1883
Caltoris brunnea caere de Nicéville, 1891
Caltoris cahira austeni Moore, 1883
Caltoris cormasa Hewitson, 1876
Caltoris kumara moorei Evans, 1926
Caltoris tulsi tulsi de Nicéville, 1883
Iton semamora semamora Moore, 1866

References

Butterflies
B
Bangladesh
Bangladesh
Butterflies